Monte Verità (Italian; German 'Berg Wahrheit', meaning "Mount Truth" or "Mountain of Truth") is a 321 metres above sea level high hill and a cultural-historical ensemble in the Swiss canton of Ticino. The site is in the municipality of Ascona, about half a kilometre north-west of the old town. Monte Verità, located on Lake Maggiore, was a well-known meeting place for the life-reformers (Lebensreform), pacifists, artists, writers and supporters of various alternative movements in the first decades of the 20th century. After 1940 the place lost its importance. An attempt at a revival in the late 1970s met with very limited success.

Monte Verità was originally the name of the local "nature healing sanctuary sun sanatorium" (Naturheilstätte Sonnen-Kuranstalt) established on the hill Monte Monescia and can be found for the first time in a brochure published in 1902. In the period that followed, the name Monte Verità was also transferred to the entire hill formerly known as Monte Monescia.

History

Settlement founders
A whole series of foreign intellectuals who had their temporary or permanent residence around Lake Maggiore in the 19th century belonged to the prehistory of the Monte Verità settlement project. The area around Locarno was then a haven for political rebels, including various Russian anarchists. Among them was Mikhail Bakunin, who had moved to Ticino in November 1869. Bakunin first lived in Locarno and later bought a villa in Minusio, which became a refuge for revolutionaries who were wanted on arrest warrants. The Russian-born Baroness  acted as a great hostess to many well-known artists and writers. The Brissago Islands, which she had owned since 1885, was the site of great festivals; they are within sight of Ascona. Around 1889, the politician and theosophist , together with Franz Hartmann and Countess Constance Wachtmeister, developed a plan to build a theosophical monastery called "Fraternitas" on Monte Monescia; presumably as "candidate" for this never-built monastery was the German life-reformer Karl Max Engelmann who had settled in Monte Brè, had belonged to the "Pythagorean League" around the nature-philosopher preacher , and was now running a vegetarian guesthouse. At that time, the hill was a vineyard threatened by phylloxera infestation, and shepherds and goatherds grazed their herds on the bare hilltop.  and  followed the Gräser brothers' proposal to acquire this site as a settlement.

The actual story of the alternative settlement project began as early as 1899 in Bled (at that time belonging to Austria-Hungary, today in Slovenia). It was there that the music teacher Ida Hofmann, who had grown up in Transylvania, and the Belgian industrialist's son Henri Oedenkoven met during a stay at the Arnold Rikli natural healing sanatorium. Both were unknown to each other until then but developed a strong sympathy for each other in the few weeks of their common cure therapy. Karl's views were influenced by his brother Gustav Gräser, who had been living a journeyman life for a year. The three Gräser brothers Karl, Ernst and Gustav went together on a hike from Bled to Florence. The aspiring painter  (1884–1944) later also lived temporarily on "Monte Verità" and lured fellow students such as Willi Baumeister, Oskar Schlemmer and Johannes Itten to the closely related colony in Amden on Walensee.

An intensive exchange of letters developed between Oedenkoven and Hofmann, which led to a meeting in Munich in October 1900. In addition to the initiators Oedenkoven and Hofmann, the brothers Karl and Gustav "Gusto" Gräser attended this meeting, as well as Ida Hofmann's sister Jenny, the teacher Lotte Hattemer and her friend Ferdinand Brune from Graz, a theosophically influenced son of a landowner. After "Oedenkoven's plan" of the founding of a so-called "vegetable cooperative" had been presented, the decision was made that "each individual's movable property [...] should be contributed to the founding of a natural healing institute [...]". The main part of the expected profit would go back to the project, the rest of the profit would be distributed among the members. If a member - for whatever reason - intends to leave the project community at a later date, the paid-in capital should be returned to him as soon as "it is liquidated". It was also decided that the cooperative should be founded on the shore of one of the northern Italian lakes and that, in order to find the right place, they wanted to set off immediately – on foot.

Vegetable cooperative and nature healing sanctuary sun sanatorium
With purchases from other owners, they acquired four hectares. They founded their "vegetable cooperative", a settlement community initially on a vegan and later vegetarian basis, and in 1902 they gave it the name Monte Verità. This name did not hide the claim of the new owners to be in possession of the truth. Rather, the new name should express the effort to live truly. Ida Hofmann later wrote in the new orthography developed mainly by Henri Oedenkoven:

There were already models for the Monte Verità settlement project. This included, among others, the Oranienburg "Eden Cooperative Fruit Growing Colony". The direct precursor was the artist community around the German painter and life-reformer Karl Wilhelm Diefenbach (1851–1913) at the "Himmelhof" near Vienna. Gustav Gräser had been his student there in 1898 and also conveyed Diefenbach's views to his brothers Karl and Ernst Gräser.

In order to finance the settlement project and at the same time make it known to a larger public, Oedenkoven and his partner Hofmann founded the Nature Healing Sanctuary Sun Sanatorium (Naturheilstätte Sonnen-Kuranstalt), which was followed shortly afterwards by the Monte Verità Sanatorium (Sanatorium Monte Verità). One of the early guests of this institution was the barefoot itinerant preacher , who took a short break on Monte Verità in November 1902 on his missionary journey from Arendsee to Jerusalem.

Anarchist physician Raphael Friedeberg moved to Ascona in 1904, attracting many other anarchists to the area.  Artists  and other famous people attracted to this hill included Hermann Hesse, Carl Jung, Erich Maria Remarque, Hugo Ball, Else Lasker-Schüler, Stefan George, Isadora Duncan, Carl Eugen Keel, Paul Klee, Carlo Mense, Arnold Ehret, Rudolf Steiner, Mary Wigman (at that time still Wiegmann), Max Picard, Ernst Toller, Henry van de Velde, Fanny zu Reventlow, Rudolf von Laban, Frieda and Else von Richthofen, Otto Gross, Erich Mühsam, Walter Segal, Max Weber, Gustav Stresemann, and Gustav Nagel.

At the beginning of the twentieth century the Lombardy term  which can be translated into "dancing naked", was also used by the Ticino peasants to designate the heterogeneous community of utopians, vegetarians, naturists, theosophists who settled on the slopes of Mount Monescia (renamed Monte Verità). This community inspired by the theories of Bakunin and Mühsam (famous anarchists), Oedenkoven, Hofmann and the Gräser's (utopian socialists), Hartmann and Pioda (vegetarian theosophists and humanists), von Laban (theorist of the "reform of life") was mainly financed by the Northern European nobility, fascinated by theories that aimed at the spiritual and physical elevation of man, also through the artistic expression of the body and the sexual revolution. The local inhabitants, in fact, observed with perplexity, the nonconformist attitudes of the members of the community of the mountain and, due to their antics, had hastily catalogued them as fools.

Monte Verità  has been cited as an example of "light asceticism" which arose during the Belle Epoque, inspired by Tolstoyan values. The colonists "abhorred private property, practised a rigid code of morality, strict vegetarianism and introduced health aspects of the German freikörperkultur movement (naturism). They rejected convention in marriage and dress, party politics and dogmas: they were tolerantly intolerant."

Rudof von Laban school for art
From 1913 to 1918, Rudolf von Laban operated a "School for Art" on Monte Verità.

Occultist Theodor Reuss
In 1917 the occultist Theodor Reuss and master of the Ordo Templi Orientis staged a conference on Monte Verità covering many themes, including societies without nationalism, women's rights, mystic freemasonry, and dance as art, ritual and religion, also addressed was the "ecstatic release" in the mysterious procedures on the "paths to enlightenment". Ruess, self-appointed grandmaster of his lodge, organized a "cult of the Mary" based on "brotherhood and sisterhood" and prepared himself to seduce the colony's women. The colony director—Henri Oedenkoven, having had enough of the midnight erotic-orgiastic rituals that took place in Reuss' sham lodge, where men and women would gather in rows simultaneously, had promptly thrown Ruess out. Insulated as a charlatan, imposter and devourer of women, Ruess left the Monte Verità colony.

Holistic health retreat
From 1923 to 1926, Monte Verità was operated as a hotel by artists Werner Ackermann, Max Bethke and Hugo Wilkens, until it was acquired in 1926 by Baron Eduard von der Heydt. The following year, a new Modernist-style hotel was built by Emil Fahrenkamp. Eduard von der Heydt died in 1964, and the site became the property of the Canton of Ticino.

Present

Monte Verità is currently home to the Swiss Federal Institute of Technology in Zürich convention centre, Congressi Stefano Franscini (CSF), as well as a museum comprising three buildings: the Casa Anatta, a flat-roofed brick and wooden building built in 1902, it served as the naturist colony founders residence and now houses an exhibition of the history of the site; the Casa Selma, a light-and-air bathing sanatorium hut built in 1904 by the first settlers; and a building housing the panoramic painting "The Clear World of the Blessed", by Elisar von Kupffer. The hill is also the site of a tea garden and Japanese teahouse. Since 2013, Monte Verità is also the home to the literature festival Eventi letterari Monte Verità.

In fiction
A fictionalized version of the colony at Monte Verità is the subject of a short story named "Monte Verità" by the Cornish author Daphne du Maurier which appeared in The Apple Tree published in 1952, and then republished under the name The Birds and Other Stories.  A.S. Byatt's 2009 novel The Children's Book mentions the colony, as does Robert Dessaix's 1996 novel Night Letters.

Monte Verita is the location for some of the climactic action in the graphic novel trilogy Suffrajitsu: Mrs. Pankhurst's Amazons (2015).

See also
Lebensreform (German and Swiss life-reform movement)
Freikörperkultur (free body culture)
Karl Wilhelm Diefenbach (pioneering social reformer)

References and sources
Notes

Sources

Museo Monte Verità handout "Highlights in the History of Monte Verità", Edition June 2007.
MONTE Verità Ascona et le génie du lieu, Kaj Noschis, Presses polytechniques et universitaires romandes, arts & culture n°73, 2011
 Edgardo Franzosini (2014). Sul Monte Verità. Il Saggiatore, Milano .

External links

Monte Verità.org
Monte Verità at fileane.com
"The Eduard von der Heydt Utopia"
Centro Stefano Franscini
Flickr.com: photo set of remains of the historic facilities
 'Freak Out' — 2014 German film about Monte Verità .

Mountains of Ticino
Hills of Europe
Lake Maggiore
Ascona
Buildings and structures in Ticino
Utopian communities
Tourist attractions in Ticino
Populated places established in 1900